Francisque Ravony (December 2, 1942, Vohipeno, Vatovavy-Fitovinany Region, Madagascar – February 15, 2003, Soavinandriana, Itasy Region, Madagascar) was a Malagasy lawyer and politician. He was a key political figure in Madagascar during the late 1980s and 1990s. He was Prime Minister of Madagascar from 1993 to 1995 under President Albert Zafy.

Ravony was elected as Prime Minister through a vote of the National Assembly on August 9, 1993. He received 55 votes, while Roger Ralison and Manandafy Rakotonirina respectively received 46 votes and 32 votes.

References

1942 births
2003 deaths
People from Vatovavy-Fitovinany
Prime Ministers of Madagascar
Malagasy lawyers